The 2022–23 Alpe Adria Cup is the seventh edition of the Alpe Adria Cup, an annual professional basketball competition. Teams from seven central european countries (Austria, Croatia, Czech Republic, Poland, Romania, Slovakia and Slovenia) compete this season.

Teams 
1st, 2nd, etc.: Place in the domestic competition

Regular season

Group A

Group B

Group C

Group D

Playoffs 
In the playoffs, teams played against each other over two legs on a home-and-away basis, except for the Final Four. In the playoffs draw, the group winners were seeded, and the runners-up were unseeded. The seeded teams were drawn against the unseeded teams, with the seeded teams hosting the second leg.

Awards
All official awards of the 2022–23 Alpe Adria Cup.

MVP of the Month

References 

Alpe Adria Cup
A
2022–23 in Croatian basketball
2022–23 in Slovenian basketball